Rugby Ottignies Club is a Belgian rugby union club currently competing in Belgian 2nd Division.

The club is based in Louvain-la-Neuve in the Belgian Province of Walloon Brabant. The official colours of the club are yellow and blue.

History
The club was founded in 1977 and played in the Belgian Elite League until the 2011–12 season when they were relegated to the 2nd Division for the 2012/13 season. The club have not  won any major trophies but were runners up in the 2003-04 edition of the Belgian Cup. Ottiginies reached the Championship playoffs in three years running between 2004–05 and 2006-07 but lost at the semi-final stage on each occasion.

Season by Season

See also
 Rugby union in Belgium
 Belgian Elite League

External links
 Official site

Belgian rugby union clubs